Sar Taveh-ye Midjan (also Romanized as Sar Ţāveh-ye Mīdjān; also known as Sar Tāveh and Sar Ţāveh) is a village in Poshtkuh-e Rostam Rural District, Sorna District, Rostam County, Fars Province, Iran. At the 2006 census, its population was 112, in 25 families.

References 

Populated places in Rostam County